Ophioblennius macclurei, the redlip blenny, is a species of combtooth blenny found in coral reefs in the western Atlantic ocean.  This species reaches a length of  TL. The specific name honours the American comparative anatomist and embryologist Charles Freeman Williams McClure (1865-1955) in recognition of his work on the lymphatic systems of fishes.

References

External links
 

macclurei
Fish described in 1915
Fish of the Atlantic Ocean